Temple View is a suburb of the city of Hamilton, New Zealand. Temple View was established in the 1950s from the construction of the Hamilton New Zealand Temple and the Church College of New Zealand by the Church of Jesus Christ of Latter-day Saints (LDS Church). Access to the suburb is through Dinsdale, and then along Tuhikaramea Road. 

In 2018 the College was demolished and it was planned to put about 200 houses on the site.

Demographics

Temple View had a population of 1,185 at the 2018 New Zealand census, an increase of 6 people (0.5%) since the 2013 census, and a decrease of 159 people (−11.8%) since the 2006 census. There were 312 households, comprising 570 males and 615 females, giving a sex ratio of 0.93 males per female. The median age was 30.2 years (compared with 37.4 years nationally), with 333 people (28.1%) aged under 15 years, 255 (21.5%) aged 15 to 29, 423 (35.7%) aged 30 to 64, and 174 (14.7%) aged 65 or older.

Ethnicities were 57.0% European/Pākehā, 66.6% Māori, 21.5% Pacific peoples, 7.3% Asian, and 1.8% other ethnicities. People may identify with more than one ethnicity.

The percentage of people born overseas was 17.7, compared with 27.1% nationally.

Although some people chose not to answer the census's question about religious affiliation, 7.1% had no religion, 89.9% were Christian, 0.5% had Māori religious beliefs, 1.0% were Hindu and 0.0% had other religions.

Of those at least 15 years old, 234 (27.5%) people had a bachelor's or higher degree, and 111 (13.0%) people had no formal qualifications. The median income was $23,900, compared with $31,800 nationally. 96 people (11.3%) earned over $70,000 compared to 17.2% nationally. The employment status of those at least 15 was that 333 (39.1%) people were employed full-time, 138 (16.2%) were part-time, and 45 (5.3%) were unemployed.

History

1950–1953
The construction of the school and the temple commenced in the 1950s, overseen by George R. Beisinger, the general supervisor of Church building in the South Pacific. Because of stringent economic conditions in New Zealand no subcontractors could be engaged, no skilled labor was available, and there were no domestic sources of supply for the bulk of needed materials. He would have to import his own cement, hardware, structural and other materials mostly from the US. As for labor he would have to leave that to providence. 

The labour for the construction was performed by volunteer workers known as labour missionaries. The workers were given a small allowance of 10 shillings per week for basic necessities, and initially were called to serve for two years. Many however extended their time upwards to between 8 and 10 years.

When they arrived, the missionaries converged on a home called the "Green House" that had been moved from one part of the project to its new location for meetings, meals at times and as a general place to socialise. There was a movie night once a week. It also served as temporary accommodation for some of the missionaries. The winter at this particular time was harsh (by New Zealand standards) and the land surrounding the green house was mud. The only available form of transportation at the time happened to be a jeep which was put to good use by Elder Beisinger to get around the project. 

Church services were conducted for a time in a building in the former Garden Place in Hamilton, which competed with another church on the street below. Later early morning seminary type meetings were held on the building site for the missionaries before going to work.

The first house was completed in 1952 and occupied by George Beisinger.

A large part of the farmland of the project was peat, and it was transformed slowly into arable land with the help of an agricultural expert called from the U.S. Often the peat would burn, and it wasn't unusual to see peat fires off in the distance. There was often a dusty reddish atmosphere about parts of the project because of the peat. The farmland itself became a source of vegetables for the missionaries. Wheat was also grown, and there were also cattle and sheep.

The bricks used for construction were manufactured at an onsite plant that was put into operation in 1951. Many of the bricks were sent abroad for use in buildings in Tonga and Samoa. A new plant was built in 1956, and it was noted that the quality of the bricks manufactured improved greatly.

1954–1955
Church activities started to be held at Temple View in 1954, and these were called "Hui Tau". The activities, which usually lasted for a week, included dancing, singing, sports, and church services. They were attended by LDS members and missionaries from across New Zealand. The proselyting missionaries were billeted out with various families in Temple View. The members who had traveled far usually stayed in makeshift accommodations. Initially many stayed in improvised sleeping quarters in the joinery building which was one of the first of the bigger buildings constructed and the school classroom buildings. The various musical items, skits and other stage activities were held in the joinery building in the evenings. For the next "Hui Taus" accommodations were in tents which at the time were located on farmland below the schools tennis courts, next to what was called "Mara Park".

Accommodation was built for single men and for families. The single men were accommodated in a dormitory which was nicknamed "the bunkhouse". The men's showers were located across from their accommodation. Small cottages were built for the families in the area behind where the George R. Biesinger (GRB) Hall is today.Concrete pathways were built to connect the buildings. There was a small canteen to serve the basic daily needs of the missionaries.

Food was sent in from members throughout the country, and some was grown or made locally. It was also standard procedure for golden queen peaches to be sent from Hawkes Bay to be made into preserves during the summer months. Butter was also manufactured on site. A makeshift abattoir was built to provide the meat for consumption. At times younger children (both local and American) would wait for the slaughter of the sheep to retrieve knucklebones for a school time game.

The construction of amenities, general purpose buildings, and school buildings occupied the lives of the building missionaries during their working hours. Concrete was poured by hand via a portable concrete mixer that was loaded by hand with the correct mix of sand and concrete, mixed with the right amount of water and then poured into wheelbarrows which the building missionaries wheeled to wherever it was needed. The whole of the project was usually mobilized for a cement pour, and the sisters always provided refreshments for the workers throughout the night.

"Kai Hall" became the church service building on Sunday while construction on site was in progress. The building was also used for social activities as well. Movies were shown on Friday night. In the evenings a section of the building was used as a gymnasium for the building missionaries during their after hours. The labour missionaries held many joint social activities with the public from Hamilton in this building. These activities such as formal dances and concerts did much for local public relations.

There was also a big band scene. A band was formed from the building missionaries who were instrumentalists, which performed at concerts and for any major ball that was held. At about this same time a big band ensemble from the US was touring New Zealand, and as part of their tour they visited Temple View and performed. In time the music of choice for local dances came from the younger missionary groups that comprised 3 guitarists and a drummer. Several concerts were also performed by the building missionaries in the Embassy theater in Hamilton.

The younger children of the missionary families attended the local primary school in Frankton and Maeroa immediate school in Hamilton.

1955–1958
David O. McKay visited New Zealand in 1955, and was duly impressed with the project. He initially came to curtail the building programme, but on visiting with the members, feeling their enthusiasm and goodwill and inspecting the construction sites he decided to expand it. He authorised the construction of two more buildings: the David O. McKay Auditorium and the Matthew Cowley administration building. The classrooms and the dormitories under construction were initially to be the extent of the school. A little later on looking up at the hill of the farm adjacent to the project he pointed and said a "there we shall build a temple".

The building programme took on added emphasis with the announcement of the construction of the Temple and the two additional school buildings. The ground for the temple was broken on 21 December by President Wendell B. Mendenhall, Ariel S. Balliff (President of the new Zealand Mission), and Elder George. R. Biesinger. Immediately after the ceremony, excavation of the site was started, and within 72 hours a pit twice the size of a football field was dug out to a depth of 19 feet. President McKay had given everyone two years to build the temple. Elder Rosenvall who was previously working on the motel was set apart to supervise the building of the temple.
  
There were no fatalities or serious injuries during the construction of the temple, school and accompanying buildings. Two infants died in the early stages of the project. One child was still born to a sister who with her husband were temporarily residing in the greenhouse, and another child drowned in the stream that used to run behind the single men's accommodation.

As the project grew it became a center of attraction for the people in the area, and tours were conducted for the general public around the project on the weekends. There were the odd misfits who gravitated to Temple View, because they saw it as a haven of sorts. Some were Latter-day Saint misfits and others were not Latter-day Saints. There was one individual who ingratiated himself into the project, but where he came from no one knew. He wasn't unpleasant, but he was quite a mystery. There happened to be a missionary on the project who was formerly in the N.Z. Police Force, and he checked the wanted records at the local police station, and found that the man in question was running from the law. Police, of course, came and apprehended him.

A choir was an integral part of church services, and it eventually became a strong focus for the musical talent of the missionaries during the building of the project. The choir was conducted by Joan Pierce and sang songs in both Māori and English.

Throughout the building of the project, church activity was conducted through the direction of leaders who were adamant about following correct procedure.  

One night a week was reserved as a social night for various musical, drama and other activities. It used to be called "Mutual" time, but the activity has since been discontinued.

The building missionaries organized sports teams, and general weekly social activities. There was a rugby team which played in the senior reserve grade, a basketball team played in a league in the city of Hamilton, movies once a week, and on Mondays an activity night for everyone. The Monday activity night started out as an entertainment night where anyone who wanted to present something or perform a musical item could do so. Later the Monday night activity became a time when the building missionaries were able to evaluate their progress with reports on the status of the individual projects. It was essentially an extra large Family Home Evening.

Education

References

 .

Suburbs of Hamilton, New Zealand
The Church of Jesus Christ of Latter-day Saints in New Zealand